is a 1971 Japanese drama film directed by Kon Ichikawa. It was entered into the 21st Berlin International Film Festival.

Cast
 Renaud Verley - Niko
 Ruriko Asaoka - Miya
 Tetsuo Ishidate - Kee chan
 Yôko Kosono
 Graciela López Colombres - Maria
 Seiji Miyaguchi - Miya's father
 Kaori Momoi - Momoyo, Miya's sister
 Thomas Ross - Charbonnier

References

External links

1971 films
1971 drama films
Films directed by Kon Ichikawa
1970s Japanese-language films
Toho films
Films produced by Sanezumi Fujimoto
Japanese drama films
1970s Japanese films